Tina McKinnor is an American politician serving as a member of the California State Assembly for the 62nd district, encompassing portions of the Westside and the South Bay regions of Los Angeles County, including Inglewood, Hawthorne, and Lawndale.

Education 
McKinnor earned an Associate's Degree in business administration and accounting from Los Angeles Southwest College and a Bachelor of Science in Accounting from California State University, Dominguez Hills.

Career 
McKinnor began her career with the Los Angeles County Office of Education, serving as an accounting clerk and auditor. During the 2004 United States presidential election, McKinnor worked for John Kerry's presidential campaign as co-chair of African-Americans for Kerry. She was also a Kerry delegate to the 2004 Democratic National Convention. She was the political treasurer for the Kaufman Legal Group and worked on campaigns for state Senator Steven Bradford and state Assemblywoman Autumn Burke.

Prior to being elected to the state assembly, McKinnor was a civic engagement director for L.A. Voice, a community advocacy organization, and previously served as chief of staff to several members of the California State Assembly. In 2019, she was the California campaign strategist for PL+US, an organization that advocates for paid leave policies. McKinnor also worked as Operations Director for the California Democratic Party.

On June 7, 2022, McKinnor won a special election to succeed Autumn Burke in the California State Assembly, defeating Lawndale Mayor Robert Pullen-Miles, a fellow Democrat, in an upset.

References

External links 
 
 Campaign website

21st-century American politicians
Living people
Democratic Party members of the California State Assembly
Year of birth missing (living people)
California State University, Dominguez Hills alumni